Brindavan College of Engineering (also referred to as BrCE) is an engineering college in Bangalore, Karnataka, India. The college is affiliated to the Visvesvaraya Technological University, Belgaum and approved by the AICTE, New Delhi. BrCE offers a four-year graduate programme in engineering leading to the award of the degree Bachelor of Engineering (B.E.). The college postgraduate programmes in Master of Business Administration (MBA), Master of Computer Applications (MCA).

The campus is 1 km from Baglur cross, on the way to Baglur on Hyderabad-Bangalore NH 7.

History 

BrCE was started by Dr. Majed A.A. Sabha, in 2008 after the success of Brindavan Group of Institutions in 1992.
B.R Shetty Venture.

Courses offered

Undergraduate programme 

Bachelor of Engineering (BE)
Mechanical Engineering
Electronics and Communication Engineering 
Computer Sciences and Engineering  
Information Science and Engineering 
Civil Engineering

Postgraduate programme 

Master of Business Administration (MBA)

Specializations
 Finance
 Human Resource
 Marketing
 Information Technology

Master of Computer Application (MCA)
Master of Technology (M.Tech)
Specializations
 Civil Structural Engineering

Library 

The library has online search facilities, a Book Bank, and an inter-library loan facility with British Council Library, Bangalore and NAL, Bangalore.

Hostels 

Separate hostels for boys and girls are within the campus. Both hostels house seniors as well as junior under same hostel.

Extracurricular activities 

Football, cricket, basketball and volleyball courts are available inside the campus. The annual college sports meet is held every year between August and October. Competitions are held to encourage students in music, dance, drama, painting, rangoli, ethnic day celebration etc.

References 

Engineering colleges in Bangalore
All India Council for Technical Education
Affiliates of Visvesvaraya Technological University
Educational institutions established in 2008
2008 establishments in Karnataka